This is a list of seasons completed by the Florida Bobcats. The Bobcats were a professional arena football franchise of the Arena Football League (AFL), based in Sunrise, Florida. The team was established in 1992 as the Sacramento Attack. The franchise only lasted their first season in Sacramento before moving to Florida and becoming the Miami Hooters. The name "Hooters" stemmed from a marketing arrangement with the restaurant chain Hooters, which is also based in Florida. The Hooters name lasted three seasons until the franchise changed its name once again to the Florida Bobcats. Never in the history of the franchise did a season end with a winning record, and they only finished higher than third place in the division once, in their inaugural year in Sacramento. Despite this, they had two playoff appearances, both coming in their first two seasons of existence, however both seasons ended in quarterfinal losses. In 2001, after an unsuccessful attempt to sell the team, the Bobcats folded. In their last years, their home games were played at National Car Rental Center, now known as the BB&T Center.

References
General
 
 
 

Arena Football League seasons by team
Florida Bobcats seasons
Florida sports-related lists
Miami-related lists
California sports-related lists